In Greek mythology, Atymnius (Ancient Greek: Ἀτύμνιος derived from atos and hymnos which means "insatiate of heroic praise") may refer to:

Atymnius, a beautiful boy, who was beloved by Sarpedon. He was the son of Cassiopeia either by the god Zeus or by her mortal husband Phoenix. Atymnius seems to have been worshipped at Gortyn in Crete together with Europa.
Atymnius, a Trojan warrior, son of Emathion and Pegasis. He was killed by Odysseus in the last year of the Trojan War.
Atymnius, father of Mydon, charioteer of Pylaemenes.
Atymnius, a companion of Sarpedon, from Lycia. He was the son of Amisodarus (who had reared Chimera) and the brother of Maris. In the Trojan War Atymnius was killed by Antilochus. In the same battle Maris, attempting to revenge his brother's death, was slain by Thrasymedes.

Notes

References 

 Apollodorus, The Library with an English Translation by Sir James George Frazer, F.B.A., F.R.S. in 2 Volumes, Cambridge, MA, Harvard University Press; London, William Heinemann Ltd. 1921. ISBN 0-674-99135-4. Online version at the Perseus Digital Library. Greek text available from the same website.
Graves, Robert, The Greek Myths, Harmondsworth, London, England, Penguin Books, 1960. 
Graves, Robert, The Greek Myths: The Complete and Definitive Edition. Penguin Books Limited. 2017. 
Homer, The Iliad with an English Translation by A.T. Murray, Ph.D. in two volumes. Cambridge, MA., Harvard University Press; London, William Heinemann, Ltd. 1924. . Online version at the Perseus Digital Library.
Homer, Homeri Opera in five volumes. Oxford, Oxford University Press. 1920. . Greek text available at the Perseus Digital Library.
 Quintus Smyrnaeus, The Fall of Troy translated by Way. A. S. Loeb Classical Library Volume 19. London: William Heinemann, 1913. Online version at theio.com
 Quintus Smyrnaeus, The Fall of Troy. Arthur S. Way. London: William Heinemann; New York: G.P. Putnam's Sons. 1913. Greek text available at the Perseus Digital Library.

Princes in Greek mythology
People of the Trojan War
Children of Zeus
Demigods in classical mythology
Cretan characters in Greek mythology
LGBT themes in Greek mythology